Jason Hill (born January 17, 1971) is an American professional golfer. He turned professional in 1993.

Hill was born in Dallas, Texas. He played college golf at Baylor University, where he won three events including the 1992 Southwest Conference individual championship.

Hill played on the Nationwide Tour (2001, 2003–08) and PGA Tour (2002). His best finish on the Nationwide Tour was a win at the 2001 Steamtown Classic. His best finish on the PGA Tour was a T-14 at the 2002 FedEx St. Jude Classic.

Professional wins (1)

Buy.com Tour wins (1)

See also
2001 Buy.com Tour graduates

References

External links

American male golfers
Baylor Bears men's golfers
PGA Tour golfers
Korn Ferry Tour graduates
Golfers from Dallas
People from Rockwall, Texas
1971 births
Living people